Annavasal block is a revenue block in Pudukkottai district, Tamil Nadu, India. It has a total of 43 panchayat villages.

Villages

References 

Revenue blocks of Pudukkottai district